Hugo Heyrman (born 20 December 1942), known by his artist name Dr. Hugo Heyrman, is a leading Belgian painter, filmmaker, internet pioneer, synesthesia and new media researcher.

Early life and education 
Dr. Hugo Heyrman was born in Zwijndrecht, he lives and works in Antwerp.  Originally, Heyrman opted for a musical education, but transferred to the visual arts. He graduated from the Royal Academy and became a laureate of the National Higher Institute for Fine Arts in Antwerp. In addition, he studied nuclear physics during one year at the State Higher Institute for Nuclear Energy in Mol. He received a Ph.D. in art sciences, magna cum laude, from the Universidad de La Laguna, in Tenerife with a thesis on Art & Computers: an exploratory investigation on the digital transformation of art.

Career
From his earliest work, Heyrman developed a specific vision on the nature of perception. "Most of my work has to do with contemporary fragility. The works are 'ways of seeing', forms of visual thinking, they make the virtual and mental space of an image real", he declares in his website. His art practice includes painting, drawing, sculpture, photography, video, film and digital media. In his website 'Museums of the Mind' he continues to publish his research, theory and experiments on the telematic future of art, the senses and synaesthesia.

During the sixties, Heyrman profiled himself as an avant-garde artist with happenings, film- and video experiments. Online since 1995, Heyrman became one of the pioneers in Net.art. He also participated in 1988 at the 'First International Symposium on Electronic Art' (FISEA) in Utrecht.

In 1995, Heyrman coined the terms "tele-synaesthesia" and "post-ego". Since 1993 he is a working member of the Royal Flemish Academy of Belgium for Science and the Arts, Brussels. As of 2006 he was a professor at the Royal Academy for Fine Arts, Antwerp.

Projects
Continental Video & Film Tour with his 'Mobile Museum of Modern Media' through Belgium, Germany, France and the Netherlands.  (1970–73)
'Street-life' paintings. Elected laureate of the 'Jeune Peinture Belge' at the Palais des Beaux-arts, Brussels (1974).
Monumental painting series on 'Water', 'Light', 'Time', 'A Vision is Finer than a View' and 'New Models of Reality', which  Heyrman describes as painting the existential tension between ideas and images; an appeal to several senses at once, and 
 Fuzzy Dreamz series, a work in progress since 1996, which Heyrman describes as the transformation of his painting experiences into digital media and vice versa.
Various Internet art projects, including the online exhibitions, Digital Studies: Being In Cyberspace 'ALT-X-site' (1997) New York and 'Revelation' ISEA 2000, Paris.
 His works have been presented in major international exhibitions ranging from Antwerp, Brussels, Basel, Amsterdam, Paris, Barcelona and Chicago to the Venice Biennale.

See also 
 Cyberarts
 Interactive art
 New media art

References

Further reading 
 Késenne, Joannes, Dr. Hugo Heyrman / Monography, 2008, [BE]  Snoeck Publishers & De Zwarte Panter, Bilingual edition Dutch and English,

External links
  Dr. Hugo Heyrman

1942 births
Living people
Contemporary painters
Belgian contemporary artists
20th-century Belgian painters
Belgian multimedia artists
Digital artists
Artists from Antwerp
Net.artists
Art websites
Royal Academy of Fine Arts (Antwerp) alumni